Alicia Garcia Herrero is a Spanish economist and academic  who has been the chief economist for Asia-Pacific at French investment bank Natixis since June 2015. Beyond her work, she is an academic and has worked in Bruegel, a Think Tank based in Brussels. She is an adjunct professor at the Hong Kong University of Science and Technology and a Senior Fellow at Bruegel, and non-resident Research Fellow at Real Instituto Elcano. Alicia is also a Member of the Advisory Board of Berlin-based think tank on China, MERICS.

Her areas of research are financial and banking issues, and monetary policy with a particular focus on emerging markets. She has also conducted extensive research on China and its impact on the rest of the world. Additionally, Herrero carries out different advisory roles for institutions such as the Hong Kong Institute for Monetary Research, the Asian Development Bank, and the European Commission. She is a member of the board of the Hong Kong Forum and co-founder of Bright Hong Kong.

Herrero has published many articles in academic journals and books. Her research work and opinions are quoted by the media, such as by Bloomberg, CNBC, CNN, Reuters, the Financial Times, Forbes and Deutschlandfunk.

Education 
García-Herrero holds two undergraduate degrees, one in economics from Bocconi University and another in business administration from the University of Burgos. She has also conducted graduate studies in International Economics at Kiel Institute of World Economics and holds a PhD in Economics from George Washington University.

Career 
García-Herrero has worked in BBVA as the chief economist for emerging markets focusing on European and Asian economic and financial issues. Prior to this she was a member of the Asian Research Program of the Bank for International Settlements, Alicia has also been a member of the Council of the European Central Bank Executive Board and has held positions at the International Monetary Fund and at the Bank of Spain.

Regarding previous academic positions, García-Herrero was a visiting faculty member of CEIBS (China), adjunct professor at Lingnan University (HKSAR), visiting professor at Johns Hopkins University (Italy), a research fellow at Elcano Royal Institute, assistant professor at Universidad Carlos III (Spain), and associate professor at Universidad Autonoma de Madrid (Spain).

Publications

References

External links
 Official website

Spanish women economists
Year of birth missing (living people)
Living people
Columbian College of Arts and Sciences alumni
Bocconi University alumni
20th-century  Spanish  economists
21st-century  Spanish  economists
Academic staff of the Autonomous University of Madrid
Johns Hopkins University faculty
Academic staff of the Charles III University of Madrid
University of Burgos alumni